Graham Andrew Chipchase (born 17 January 1963) is a British businessman. He is the chief executive officer (CEO) of Brambles, an Australian logistics company.

Early life
He has a bachelor's degree in chemistry from Oriel College, University of Oxford.

Career
Chipchase was announced as the incoming CEO of Australian-based company Brambles Limited on 18 August 2016. Chipchase commenced with Brambles as CEO designate on 1 January 2017, working with outgoing CEO Tom Gorman for a two-month transitional period until he assumed the role as CEO on 1 March 2017.
Previously Chipchase had been the CEO of Rexam since 4 January 2010, joining the company as finance director on 10 March 2003.

Chipchase started his career with Coopers & Lybrand, where he trained as a chartered accountant. Later he joined BOC Group, serving as corporate finance manager since 1990, rising to director of planning and financial control. In 2001, he joined GKN , as finance director of its aerospace services business.

Chipchase has been a non-executive director at AstraZeneca since 26 April 2012.

Personal life
Chipchase is married, and has two stepdaughters. His hobbies are playing golf, wine collecting, and supporting Manchester United and the Red Bull Racing Formula One team.

He is a donor of the Conservative Party.

References

1963 births
Living people
British accountants
British chief executives
British corporate directors
Alumni of Oriel College, Oxford
Conservative Party (UK) donors